is a private junior college, located in the city of Iwaki, Fukushima, Japan.

History
was established in 2007. The predecessor of the school was founded in 1966 as the Shoheiko Junior College. It changed its name to Iwaki Junior College in 1972

External links
  

Japanese junior colleges
Educational institutions established in 1966
Private universities and colleges in Japan
Universities and colleges in Fukushima Prefecture
1966 establishments in Japan
Iwaki, Fukushima